National Route 231 is a national highway of Japan connecting Kita-ku, Sapporo and Rumoi, Hokkaido in Japan, with a total length of 129.2 km (80.28 mi).

References

National highways in Japan
Roads in Hokkaido